Wehnert is a surname. Notable people with the surname include:

 Bertha Wehnert-Beckmann (1815–1901), German photographer
 E. H. Wehnert (1813–1868), English painter 
 Herbert Wehnert (born 1947), West German handball player

See also
 Wehner
 Weinert